Sonu Gowda is an Indian actress who works predominantly in Kannada-language films. She made her debut in Inthi Ninna Preethiya and appeared in films including Paramesha Panwala and Gulama. She has also starred in Tamil and a few Malayalam films where she is credited as Shruthi Ramakrishnan.

Personal life
Sonu was born to Ramakrishna, a make-up artist who has worked in the Kannada film industry. She has a sister Neha Gowda, who is a television actress known for her roles in the Telugu television drama series Swathi Chinukulu, Kannada Soap Era Lakshmi Baramma and Kalyana Parisu. Sonu studied at the Carmel High School, Padhmanabhanagar, Bangalore.

Career 
Sonu's first film was Inthi Ninna Preethiya, where she worked alongside actor Srinagar Kitty.
Sonu is also part of WeMove Theatre, a popular Bangalore based theatre company. She played one of the heroines in the Tamil film 144 (2015).
Sonu has also acted in Gultoo.

Filmography

Films

Television

Awards and nominations

References

External links
 
 

Actresses from Bangalore
Indian film actresses
Living people
Actresses in Malayalam cinema
Actresses in Kannada cinema
Actresses in Tamil cinema
21st-century Indian actresses
1990 births